Fijian Australians refers to Australian citizens or residents of Australia who are of ethnic iTaukei or Indian descent. Most Fijians Australians live in New South Wales (Sydney), Queensland (Brisbane) and Victoria (Melbourne).

Australia is home to the largest Fijian population in the world outside Fiji itself.

According to the 2011 Australian census 48,141 Australians were born in Fiji.

Many Fijian Australians have established names for themselves in professional Australian sport, particularly in rugby union, rugby league and Australian rules football.

Notable Fijian Australians

Fijian Australians of iTaukei ethnicity

 Reagan Campbell-Gillard
 Alipate Carlile
 Petero Civoniceva
 Ellia Green
 Jarryd Hayne
 Scott Higginbotham
 Apisai Koroisau
 Chris Kuridrani
 Tevita Kuridrani
 Setanta Ó hAilpín
 Nemani Nadolo
 Noa Nadruku
 Nic Naitanui
 Simone Nalatu
 Paulini
 Esava Ratugolea
 David Rodan
 John Sutton
 Manoa Thompson
 MC Trey
 Lote Tuqiri
 Samu Wara
 Jason Bukuya
 Tariq Sims

Fijian Australians of Indian ethnicity

 Noor Dean
 Nalini Krishan
 Julian Moti
 Neil Prakash
 Sudesh Mishra
 Paresh Narayan
 Jack Ram
 K. C. Ramrakha
 Jason Singh
 Lisa Singh
 Ben Volavola

References

Notes

Ethnic groups in Australia
 
Australia